The Ghana Chamber of Telecommunications is an umbrella organization that regulates and promotes the interests of telecommunication companies in Ghana. Kwaku Sakyi-Addo was the Chief executive officer for the first six years of its existence. He resigned in April 2017. The Chamber is headed by Ing. Kenneth Ashigbey

References

Business organisations based in Ghana